Andre Dwyer (born 27 March 1982) is a Jamaican cricketer. He played in two first-class matches for the Jamaican cricket team in 2007.

See also
 List of Jamaican representative cricketers

References

External links
 

1982 births
Living people
Jamaican cricketers
Jamaica cricketers
People from Manchester Parish